Lough Fern is a freshwater lake in the northwest of Ireland. It is located in north County Donegal near the town of Milford.

Geography
The lake has two islands at its northern end, including one crannog.

Hydrology
Lough Fern is fed mainly by the River Leannan entering at its southern end and also by a stream entering at the northern end. The lake drains eastwards into the continuation of the Leannan, which in turn enters Lough Swilly at Rathmelton.

Natural history
Fish species in Lough Fern include brown trout, salmon, three-spined stickleback, perch and the critically endangered European eel. Lough Fern is part of the Leannan River Special Area of Conservation.

See also
List of loughs in Ireland

References

Fern